Edward Dorr Griffin Prime (1814–1891) was an American clergyman and journalist. He was born at Cambridge, N. Y., and graduated from Union College in 1832. He graduated from Princeton Theological Seminary in 1838 and had pastorates at Scotchtown, N. Y. and New York City. In 1853 he became substitute editor of the New York Observer, while his brother Samuel Irenæus Prime, was in Europe. Afterward the two were associated until 1885. Edward Prime continued to edit the paper for a year after his brother's death. He traveled much abroad, spent the winter of 1854–1855 in Rome, and made a journey round the world in 1869–1870 to study religious conditions in Eastern countries. He published: 
 Around the World (1872)
 Forty Years in the Turkish Empire; or Memoirs of Rev. William Goodell (1876)
 Civil and Religious Liberty in Turkey (1875)
 Notes ... of the Prime Family (1888)

He is named after, but not related to, theologian Edward Dorr Griffin.

 

American non-fiction writers
American Christian clergy
19th-century Christian clergy
People from Cambridge, New York
1814 births
1891 deaths
Union College (New York) alumni
People from Wallkill, Orange County, New York
19th-century American journalists
American male journalists
19th-century male writers
Journalists from New York City
19th-century American clergy